The Minnesota Music Hall of Fame is located at First North Street and Broadway in New Ulm, Minnesota, United States, in the former public library. It has memorabilia of individual musicians and musical groups, as well as photographs of all who have been inducted. The museum is open during the summer months and by special request during the winter.

Exhibits honor Minnesota music legends like Bob Dylan, Judy Garland, Prince, Eddie Cochran, Bobby Vee, Ervin Wolfe, John Denver, Whoopee John Wilfahrt, Harold Loeffelmacher, Earl Schmidt, Wally Pikal and The Andrews Sisters. It also documents local ethnic music, like the popularity of polka music in rural Minnesota.

Each year, new inductees are added at a dinner ceremony in October.

See also
 List of music museums

External links
Minnesota Music Hall of Fame website

Music
Halls of Fame
Museums in Brown County, Minnesota
Music halls of fame
Music museums in the United States
New Ulm, Minnesota
State halls of fame in the United States
American popular music
History museums in Minnesota
1962 establishments in Minnesota
Museums established in 1962